Greg Holden Lippmann (born 1968/1969) is an American hedge fund manager, and one of the key figures in Michael Lewis' book The Big Short.

Early life
Greg Lippmann is the son of Susan Lippmann, a business manager at Purchase College, and Thomas J. Lippmann,  the retired owner of the DBL Operating Corporation, a real estate investment and management business in New York, both of Scarsdale, New York.

He earned a bachelor's degree in economics from the University of Pennsylvania in 1991.

Career
Lippmann worked for Deutsche Bank, as global head of asset-backed securities trading, until he left in April 2010, and was succeeded by Pius Sprenger.

In February 2010, Lippmann announced that he would be joining a hedge fund started by Fred Brettschneider, who was formerly Deutsche Bank's head of global markets. Lippmann co-founded LibreMax Partners with Brettschneider, and is its Chief Investment Officer and Portfolio Manager.

In May 2016, Bloomberg LP reported that Lippmann was working with Promise Financial on a wedding loans business.

Personal life
On December 14, 2002, he married Dr. Kimberly Lee Duckworth, the daughter of Ingrid D. Bellemère of Las Vegas and Stephen M. Duckworth of Naples, Florida, at the 200 Fifth Club in New York City, in a ceremony officiated by Rabbi Stephen A. Klein.

In the 2015 movie The Big Short, a character based on Lippmann was portrayed by actor Ryan Gosling.

References

Living people
American bankers
University of Pennsylvania alumni
Deutsche Bank people
1960s births
American hedge fund managers
Chief investment officers